Rock Tha Party
is a remix album by the Bombay Rockers of their hit tracks "Sexy Mama"  "Rock Tha Party".
It features eight versions of each song.

Track listing
 "Sexy Mama" (Radio Edit)
 "Sexy Mama" (Busybody Remix)
 "Sexy Mama" (Providers Remix)
 "Sexy Mama" (Desi Daaro Bhangra mix)
 "Sexy Mama" (Junky Bump mix)
 "Sexy Mama" (Ethnic Chillout mix)
 "Sexy Mama" (Instrumental)
 "Sexy Mama" (Acapella)
 "Rock Tha Party" (Radio Edit)
 "Rock Tha Party" (Extender Version)
 "Rock Tha Party" (Busybody Remix)
 "Rock Tha Party" (Saqib Remix)
 "Rock Tha Party" (Sidel & Muff Mix)
 "Rock Tha Party" (Sidelmann Twisted dub)
 "Rock Tha Party" (Instrumental)
 "Rock Tha Party" (Rockapella)

Bombay Rockers albums
2004 remix albums